Ctenolepisma ciliatum is a species of primitive insect of the order Zygentoma. Described from Spain, it is a common species in subarid habitats of the Mediterranean bassin from Portugal to Western Asia. It is very close to C. longicaudatum. Its dorsal pattern is usually uniformly brownish or greyish with iridescences, or with two or four longitudinal fringes along the abdomen. Anatomic/morphologic differences with related species involve microscopic characters as setation or shape and distribution of scales.

References

On Ctenolepisma ciliata and a new related species, Ctenolepisma armeniaca sp. n. (Zygentoma, Lepismatidae)

Lepismatidae
Insects of Europe
Fauna of Spain
Insects described in 1831
Taxa named by Léon Jean Marie Dufour